Robert L. Mosher (January 18, 1915 – December 15, 1972) was a television and radio scriptwriter.

Biography
Mosher was born in Auburn, New York, to Robert L. Mosher Sr. and Marian K. Mosher (née McCamey). He was best known for his work on Amos and Andy, Meet Mr. McNutley, Leave It To Beaver, Ichabod and Me, Bringing Up Buddy, and The Munsters, along with his co-writer Joe Connelly who is buried in Culver City's Holy Cross Cemetery. Mosher was a 1937  Susquehanna University graduate. He died of a brain tumor in the Encino district of Los Angeles.

References

External links

1915 births
1972 deaths
People from Auburn, New York
Writers from New York (state)
American television writers
American male television writers
People from Greater Los Angeles
Susquehanna University alumni
Screenwriters from New York (state)
20th-century American screenwriters
20th-century American male writers